Brickellia oreithales is a Mexican species of flowering plants in the family Asteraceae. It is native to northern and western Mexico, states of Sonora, Chihuahua, Durango, Jalisco, and Zacatecas.

Brickellia oreithales is an herb up to 60 cm (24 inches) tall. The plant produces several small white or pale purple flower heads with disc florets but no ray florets.

References

External links
Photo of herbarium specimen at Missouri Botanical Garden, collected in Chihuahua, isotype of Kuhnia oreithales/Brickellia oreithales

oreithales
Flora of Mexico
Plants described in 1918